Lady Brigid Katharine Rachel Guinness (30 July 19208 March 1995) was the youngest daughter of Rupert Guinness, 2nd Earl of Iveagh, and wife of Prince Frederick of Prussia, grandson of Wilhelm II, German Emperor.

Early life
Brigid was born in London, fifth child and youngest daughter of Rupert Guinness, 2nd Earl of Iveagh (1874–1967, son of Edward Guinness, 1st Earl of Iveagh), and his wife, Lady Gwendolen Onslow (1881–1966, daughter of William Onslow, 4th Earl of Onslow). She belonged to the Guinness family, Irish Protestants noted for their accomplishments in brewing, banking, politics and diplomacy.

During the Second World War she served as an auxiliary nurse, where she met her future husband, Prince Frederick of Prussia, when he was injured in an accident involving a tractor.

Marriage
Brigid married on 30 July 1945 at Little Hadham, Hertfordshire to Prince Frederick of Prussia (1911–1966), fourth son of William, German Crown Prince, and his wife, Duchess Cecilie of Mecklenburg-Schwerin, and grandson of Wilhelm II, German Emperor.

They had five children:

Prince Frederick Nicholas (born 3 May 1946) married non-dynastically, Hon. Victoria Lucinda Mancroft (born 7 March 1952, daughter of Stormont Mancroft, 2nd Baron Mancroft) on 27 February 1980 in London and has issue.
Beatrice von Preussen (born 10 February 1981)
Florence von Preussen (born 28 July 1983) married Hon. James Tollemache (son of Timothy Tollemache, 5th Baron Tollemache) on 10 May 2014, and has issue:
Sylvie Beatrice Selina Tollemache (born 2 March 2016)
Augusta Lily von Preussen (born 15 December 1986) married Caspar Helmore on 19 September 2015. They have one son:
Otto Frederick Charles Helmore (born 11 August 2018)
Frederick (Fritz) Nicholas Stormont von Preussen (born 11 June 1990) married Mathilda (Tilly) Noel Johnson (born in 1989) on 25 May 2021.
Prince Andreas (born 14 November 1947) married non-dynastically, Alexandra Blahova (28 December 1947 - 8 September 2019) on 2 January 1979, and has issue:
Tatiana von Preussen (born 16 October 1980) married Philip Alan Womack (born in 1981) on 28 June 2014. They have three children:
Arthur Frederick Richard Womack (born 21 November 2015)
Xenia Alexandra Selena Womack (born 29 August 2020)
Amalia Maria Brigid Womack (born 29 August 2020)
Frederick Alexander von Preussen (born 15 November 1984) married Antalya Nall-Cain (born 3 November 1987, daughter of Charles Nall-Cain, 3rd Baron Brocket) on 27 September 2020.
Princess Victoria Marina  (born 22 February 1952) married Philippe Alphonse Achache (born 25 March 1945) on 3 May 1976, and has issue:
George Jean Achache (born 8 June 1980)
Francis Maximilian Frederick Achache (born 30 April 1982)
Prince Rupert (born 28 April 1955) married non-dynastically, Ziba Rastegar-Javaheri (born 12 December 1954, into a family of wealthy Iranian industrialists) on 5 January 1982 in London, and has issue:
Brigid von Preussen (born 24 December 1983)
Astrid von Preussen (born 16 April 1985) 
Princess Antonia (born 28 April 1955) who married Charles Wellesley, 9th Duke of Wellington on 3 February 1977 at St. Paul's Church, London, and has issue.

She married secondly, on 3 June 1967 at Old Windsor, Berkshire to Major Anthony Patrick Ness (1914–1993); they had no children.

Notes and sources

L'Allemagne dynastique, Huberty, Giraud, Magdelaine, Reference: vol V page 262

1920 births
1995 deaths
British women nurses
British women in World War II
Female wartime nurses
Nurses from London
Brigid
Brigid
Daughters of British earls
Prussian princesses
Princesses by marriage